Advance Steel is a CAD software application for 3D modeling and detailing of steel structures and automatic creation of fabrication drawings, bill of materials and NC files. It was initially developed by GRAITEC, but was acquired by Autodesk in 2013. The software runs on AutoCAD.

Features 
The application supports all basic AutoCAD concepts and functions (snap points, grip points, copy, etc.). When running on its own CAD platform, the application provides the same capabilities as running on AutoCAD. The Advance Steel CAD platform serves both as a graphic engine and an object oriented database. Compliancy is assured between versions of Advance Steel running on its own CAD platform and running on AutoCAD.

The Advance Steel information is stored in DWG format.

The application includes AutoLisp (enhancing standard AutoLisp to include Advance Steel commands) and COM (VBA, C++) programming interfaces. This means that users can create their own customized macros for specialist requirements.

Advance Steel imports and exports to the following file formats:
 GTC
 DWG
 IFC 2x3
 CIS/2
 SDNF
 PSS
 KISS (“Keep it Simple, Steel”)
 DSTV
 DXF

The main functions of Advance Steel concern:
 Creation of 3D model using a library of construction elements (i.e., beams, plates, bolts, welds, etc.)
 Sheet metal and plate work 
 Advanced tools for element collision detection
 Clear workshop drawings, automatically labeled and dimensioned
 Checking the model in order to insure a correctly built 3D model and accurate bills of materials 
 Automatic creation of general arrangement and shop drawings, fabrication drawings, fitting drawings, isometric views and fabrication drawings
 Drawing creation workflow management (revision control, automatic update, etc.)
 Automatic creation of lists / bills of materials and NC files
 Multi-user technology - all users involved in a project can work simultaneously and securely on the same model, without errors.

Advance Steel provides instruments for modeling complex structures such as straight and spiral stairs, railings, and ladders. The program creates all necessary documents (including NC files) for the stair fabrication.

Specific features

Parametric steel connections

Advance Steel has a library of more than 300 preset parametric steel connections to connect Advance elements grouped in the following categories: beam end to end joints, base plate joints, general bracing joints, cantilever beam to column joints, plate joints, clip angle joints, pylon joints, tube brace joints, purlin joints, stiffener joints, and turnbuckle bracings.

The user creates all connecting elements by a single operation. At the same time, the connected elements are processed (shortened, coped, etc.). The software allows users to customize the connections:

 Set the parameters of the joint
 Process the connected elements
 Transfer the properties from one steel connection to another
 Update the steel connection

Joint Design engine

The software dimensions and checks joints according to Eurocodes 3 standards and AISC North American standards. A design report can be created.

Drawing styles

Based on a 3D model, dimensioned and labeled 2D general arrangement and shop drawings can be automatically created using drawing styles. The drawings are created in separate DWG files; however, they are linked to track changes. Thus, the drawings can be updated after any model modifications and the drawing revision can be managed.

The software has a variety of predefined drawing styles for the creation of general arrangement drawings and shop drawings for single parts and assemblies. A drawing style is a set of rules used to create a detail drawing and defines the elements that are displayed including labeling and dimensioning preferences.

Drawing styles provide the option to automatically create drawings and to modify the layout exactly to user requirements. Drawing styles are used in a similar way to AutoCAD dimension styles, line styles, etc. The predefined drawing styles are different for each installation and country. Custom drawing styles can also be defined.

Software compatibility 

The application is compatible with: 
 Windows 10, Windows 8, Windows 7, Windows Vista, Windows XP Pro (32-bit and 64-bit)
 AutoCAD 2010, 2011, 2012, 2013, 2014, 2015, 2016, 2017
 AutoCAD Architecture 2010, 2011, 2012, 2013, 2014, 2015, 2016, 2017

Software interoperability 

Advance Steel integrates GRAITEC's data synchronization technology, GTC (GRAITEC Transfer Center). This technology offers:

 Import/export data in standard formats: CIS/2, SDNF, PSS, IFC 2.x3
 Multiple Advance Steel users that work simultaneously on the same project and synchronize their models
 Synchronization in Advance Steel of modifications made by engineers in other GRAITEC software (section changes, addition of structural elements, etc.)

Release history

See also 
 Comparison of CAD editors for CAE
 Tekla Structures

References

External links 
 Advance Steel official page
 Projects created with Advance Steel
 Advance Steel demos

Computer-aided engineering software
Civil engineering
3D graphics software
Product lifecycle management
Computer-aided design software
Autodesk acquisitions
Building information modeling
GRAITEC products